USS Joy has been the name of more than one United States Navy ship, and may refer to:

, a patrol vessel in commission from 1917 to 1918
USS Joy (DD-951), the original name of a destroyer renamed  in 1957 while under construction

United States Navy ship names